Maria Strong is the Associate Register of Copyrights and Director of Policy and International Affairs of the United States Copyright Office.

Career 

Maria Strong has served in a number of roles at the U.S. Copyright Office. As the Associate Register of Copyrights and Director of Policy and International Affairs (PIA), she advises the Register with critical policy functions of the Copyright Office, including domestic and international copyright analyses, legislative support for Congress, and trade negotiations involving intellectual property matters. Since November 5, 2021, she also has been serving as the Acting Director of Operations and Assistant Register of Copyrights (ARDO).

On December 18, 2019, Librarian of Congress Carla Hayden appointed her acting register of copyrights, effective January 5, 2020, to serve until a replacement was named for the departing register Karyn Temple.  During her leadership in 2020, Strong managed the Office through operational challenges caused by the COVID-19 pandemic. Copyright Office staff adapted quickly and effectively to remote work, and continued to serve Congress and the public. The office released the report, Section 512 of Title 17, along with a new webpage on the Digital Millennium Copyright Act; continued regulatory work to implement the Music Modernization Act; and launched the eighth triennial section 1201 rulemaking. The Office adjusted procedures and practices to promote better public services and continued to provide core services involving registration, recordation, access to public records, and statutory licensing. Modernization of IT systems continued, with the first public release of the online recordation pilot and the soft launch of a new public records system. In May 2020, the Office issued a new edition of the Copyright Act (Circular 92) as part of celebrating its 150th anniversary. Strong was named one of the 50 most influential people in intellectual property in 2020 by the publication Managing IP.  In addition to serving as Acting Register, Strong continued to serve as associate register of copyrights and director of PIA.  She returned to that position when Shira Perlmutter took office as the fourteenth register of copyrights on October 25, 2020.  

Strong joined the Copyright Office in 2010 as senior counsel for policy and international affairs. From April to July 2013, she served as the office's acting general counsel. She was named deputy director of policy and international affairs in 2015, and Director in April 2019.  Strong began her legal career as a staff attorney for the Federal Communications Commission, and spent nineteen years in private practice in Washington, D.C., prior to joining the Copyright Office.  She earned her BA in communication studies from UCLA, her MA in communications management from the USC Annenberg School of Communications, and her JD from the George Washington University Law School.

References

  
  

American women lawyers
Living people
United States Registers of Copyright
University of California, Los Angeles alumni
USC Annenberg School for Communication and Journalism alumni
George Washington University Law School alumni
Place of birth missing (living people)
Year of birth missing (living people)